Pedro Carrizo (28 January 1921 – 22 September 1997) was a Uruguayan boxer. He competed in the men's bantamweight event at the 1948 Summer Olympics.

References

1921 births
1997 deaths
Uruguayan male boxers
Olympic boxers of Uruguay
Boxers at the 1948 Summer Olympics
Sportspeople from Montevideo
Bantamweight boxers